Daniel James Cortese (born September 14, 1967) is an American actor and director. He played Perry Rollins on Veronica's Closet and Vic Meladeo on What I Like About You.

Early life and education
Of Italian (Calabrese) descent, Cortese was born on September 14, 1967, in Sewickley, Pennsylvania, and graduated from Quaker Valley High School in Leetsdale, where he played football and basketball. Prior to becoming an actor, Cortese played college football at the University of North Carolina as a backup quarterback. In his freshman year in 1986, the Tar Heels went to the Aloha Bowl in Hawaii. Cortese graduated from the University of North Carolina at Chapel Hill with a Bachelor of Arts degree in broadcasting in 1990.

Career
Cortese first came to prominence as the host of the Emmy Award-winning show MTV Sports from 1992 to 1997. Cortese was also the player/coach of The Bricklayers and The Homeboys for the MTV Rock N' Jock games. During Burger King's "Your Way, Right Away" advertising campaign in the 1990s, Cortese was hired as the company's official spokesperson. He appeared in over 90 national and regional commercials for the fast food giant.

In 1993, per producer Joel Silver, Cortese made two separate cameos (Taco Bell Lounge singer and a Cryo Prison guard) in the hit Sylvester Stallone film Demolition Man. Also, in 1993, Cortese landed the lead role in NBC's remake of "Route 66". In 1994, he co-starred in the CBS police drama Traps with Academy Award winner George C. Scott. He gained further recognition in 1995 as Jess Hanson in Melrose Place.  He played Jake Hanson's half brother for 8 episodes in the third season but he was killed off in that season's cliffhanger finale. 
In 1996, Cortese starred as Jason in the NBC TV movie The Lottery. The film turned out to be the highest rated of the year for the network. Also in 1996, he starred in the feature film Weekend In The Country with Jack Lemmon, as well as the HBO film Public Enemies. 

Cortese appeared on the NBC sitcom Seinfeld. He played Tony, the ultra-cool, good-looking, rock climbing boyfriend of Elaine Benes (Julia Louis-Dreyfuss). In the episode, titled "The Stall", he was dubbed a "mimbo" (a male bimbo) by Jerry. During rehearsals, Cortese improvised the line "Step off", which became the catchphrase that Larry David insisted was used for the episode.

From 1997 to 2000, Cortese starred with Kirstie Alley in Veronica's Closet, part of NBC's "Must See TV" Thursday night lineup. Then in 2000, he starred with Brooke Shields in the feature film After Sex. Cortese followed that up in 2001 with the TBS film The Triangle with Luke Perry. In 2003, Cortese came back to comedy and starred in the sitcom Rock Me Baby.

From 2002 to 2003, Cortese also had a recurring role in the first season of The WB sitcom What I Like About You as Vic Maledeo, the boss of Val Tyler (Jennie Garth). He reprised the role as a series regular from 2005 to 2006 in the fourth and final season. He also directed the episode "The Other Woman" that same season. In 2004, he appeared in two episodes of the third season of the ABC Family sitcom 8 Simple Rules as Scott McCallister, a tennis coach who is briefly caught in a love triangle with his player Bridget Hennessy (Kaley Cuoco) and her mother Cate Hennessy (Katey Sagal). Also in 2004, he starred in the SyFy film Locusts: The 8th Plague.

In 2008, producer Mark Burnett then hired Cortese to host My Dad Is Better Than Your Dad for NBC. Cortese got back to his athletic roots for ABC and appeared in the eight-episode special The Superstars.

In 2008, Cortese co-starred with Emily Osment in the feature film Soccer Mom as Lorenzo Vincenzo, a world-famous Italian soccer player.

He co-hosted the ABC game show Crash Course in 2009. Also in 2009, he co-starred with Bob Saget in the sitcom Surviving Suburbia. In 2010, Cortese hosted VH-1's weight loss competition Money Hungry.

In 2012, Cortese guest-starred in the Hot in Cleveland episode (#3.8) titled "God and Football". where he played Jimmy Armstrong, a professional football player.

From 2013 to 2014, Cortese served a two-year run as the host of truTV's Guinness World Records Unleashed. In 2015, Cortese starred in the feature film Changing Seasons. In 2019, Cortese showed off his rapping skills on the hit TBS show Drop The Mic.

On October 11, 2014, while reprising his role as Stefon on Saturday Night Live, Bill Hader repeatedly mentions Cortese's name during the show's Weekend Update segment when he speaks of New York City's hot spots.

Filmography

References

External links

1967 births
Living people
American directors
American game show hosts
American male film actors
Male models from Pennsylvania
American male television actors
Burger King people
Spokespersons
North Carolina Tar Heels football players
Male actors from Pennsylvania
People from Sewickley, Pennsylvania
Players of American football from Pennsylvania
American people of Italian descent
UNC Hussman School of Journalism and Media alumni